Zwoliński (feminine: Zwolińska; plural: Zwolińscy) is a Polish surname.

Notable people with the surname include:
 Klaudia Zwolińska (born 1998), Polish canoeist
 Krzysztof Zwoliński (born 1959), Polish athlete
 Łukasz Zwoliński (born 1993), Polish footballer
 Walter Zwolinski (born 1946), Canadian musician

See also

References

Polish-language surnames